Hans Grunder (born 13 June 1956 in Rüderswil; in Vechigen) is a Swiss politician in the Conservative Democratic Party of Switzerland (BDP).

Life 
Hans Grunder lives in Rüegsau. He comes from a rural family, is married and has five children. Since 1987, he has been the owner of an international survey-consulting company with around 140 staff. He is also known regionally (and not uncontroversially) as the president of the SCL Tigers. Since 2001, he has also worked with his family on his own horse breeding farm.

In 1999, Grunder was elected as a representative of the Swiss People's Party (SVP) in the Grand Council of Bern. He was vice-president of the Trachselwald District branch of the SVP, from November 1999 until November 2006. After that he was President of the same branch until 2008. In the 2007 Swiss federal election he won a seat in the National Council.

Grunder was co-founder of the BDP of the Canton of Bern. On 1 November 2008, he was elected party president at the inaugural general meeting of the BDP as a national party. In the 2011 federal election he was re-elected to the National Council. On 5 May 2012, Grunder resigned from the position of party president His successor was Martin Landolt.

References

External links 

Website of Hans Grunder
Website of Grunder's Horse Farm
Der Ingenieur der BDP. Video feature on 10vor10 (2 June 2011)

Members of the National Council (Switzerland)
Conservative Democratic Party of Switzerland politicians
Swiss People's Party politicians
1956 births
Living people